Jacques Vigouroux Duplessis, also Jacques Vigoureux-Duplessis (c.1680–1732) was a French painter. He was active from 1699 to 1730, and is mainly known for his Rococo Chinoiserie or Orientalist paintings, and decorative objects and scenes.

In 1721 he became an instructor at the Royal Tapestry Manufacture in Beauvais, a post he held until 1726.

Notes

Paintings

17th-century French painters
French male painters
18th-century French painters
1680s births
1732 deaths
18th-century French male artists